Pilmaiquén Hydroelectric Plant  is a series of hydroelectric power stations and projects owned by Statkraft, using water from Pilmaiquén River in Los Ríos Region, Chile.

Rucatayo 
The Rucatayo plant produces  of electricity. The plant was built by ENDESA between 1944 and 1959 was owned by  Pilmaiquén S.A. until 2015, when Statkraft bought it, along with the development rights to Osorno and Los Lagos. Rucatayo delivers around 304 GWh per year.

Los Lagos 
The Los Lagos project was planned at 50.8 MW power, delivering around 310 GWh per year. It was modified to 51.6 MW power, but reduced to 260 GWh energy per year, starting in late 2022.

Osorno 
The Osorno project has 54.3 MW power, delivering around 343 GWh per year. No decision has been made about starting the project.

References

Energy infrastructure completed in 1959
Energy infrastructure in Los Lagos Region
Energy infrastructure in Los Ríos Region
Hydroelectric power stations in Chile